The Hydrogen energy vision and technology roadmap is the roadmap of China initiated by the Ministry of Science and Technology, it makes hydrogen and fuel cell technologies important thematic priorities of the S&T development plan.

See also
Hydrogen economy

References

External links
Ministry of Science and Technology homepage

Energy in China
Hydrogen economy